Neeya is a 2015 soap opera that aired Monday through Thursday on MediaCorp Vasantham from 6 April 2015 to 25 June 2015 for 45 episodes. The show final episode aired 26 June 2015.

The show starred Shafinah Banu, Dhivyah Raveen, AlNisa Sultan, Hari Krishnan and Chandiramogan among others.  It was director by Anbu Aran. The show story of A Jealous close friend is worse than a friendly hidden enemy.

Cast
 Shafinah Banu
 Dhivyah Raveen
 AlNisa Sultan
 Hari Krishnan
 Chandiramogan
 Kokila Gobinathan
 Katijah Haji Midian
 S.Siva Kuma
 Sithira Thevi
 T.K Maniyan

Original soundtrack
The background score and songs were composed by Vicknesh Saravanan.

Soundtrack

References

External links 
 Vasantham Official Website

Tamil-language romance television series
Singapore Tamil dramas
2015 Tamil-language television series debuts
Vasantham TV original programming
Tamil-language television shows in Singapore
2015 Tamil-language television series endings